

Events

Pre-1600
1477 – Battle of Nancy: Charles the Bold is defeated and killed in a conflict with René II, Duke of Lorraine;  Burgundy subsequently becomes part of France.

1601–1900
1675 – Battle of Colmar: The French army beats Brandenburg.
1757 – Louis XV of France survives an assassination attempt by Robert-François Damiens, who becomes the last person to be executed in France by drawing and quartering (the traditional form of capital punishment used for regicides).
1781 – American Revolutionary War: Richmond, Virginia, is burned by British naval forces led by former American general Benedict Arnold.
1822 – The government of Central America votes for total annexation to the First Mexican Empire.
1875 – The Palais Garnier, one of the most famous opera houses in the world, is inaugurated in Paris.
1895 – Dreyfus affair: French army officer Alfred Dreyfus is stripped of his rank and sentenced to life imprisonment on Devil's Island.
1900 – Irish nationalist leader John Edward Redmond calls for revolt against British rule.

1901–present
1911 – Kappa Alpha Psi, the world's third oldest and largest black fraternity, is founded at Indiana University.
1912 – The sixth All-Russian Conference of the Russian Social Democratic Labour Party (Prague Party Conference) opens. In the course of the conference, Vladimir Lenin and his supporters break from the rest of the party to form the Bolshevik movement.
1913 – First Balkan War: The Battle of Lemnos begins; Greek admiral Pavlos Kountouriotis forces the Turkish fleet to retreat to its base within the Dardanelles, from which it did not venture for the rest of the war.
1914 – The Ford Motor Company announces an eight-hour workday and minimum daily wage of $5 in salary plus bonuses.
1919 – The German Workers' Party, which would become the Nazi Party, is founded in Munich.
1925 – Nellie Tayloe Ross of Wyoming becomes the first female governor in the United States.
1933 – Construction of the Golden Gate Bridge begins in San Francisco Bay.
1941 – Amy Johnson, a 37-year-old pilot and the first woman to fly solo from London to Australia, disappears after bailing out of her plane over the River Thames, and is presumed dead. 
1944 – The Daily Mail becomes the first major London newspaper to be published on both sides of the Atlantic Ocean.
1945 – The Soviet Union recognizes the new pro-Soviet Provisional Government of the Republic of Poland.
1949 – In his State of the Union address, United States President Harry S. Truman unveils his Fair Deal program.
1950 – In the Sverdlovsk air disaster, all 19 of those on board are killed, including almost the entire national ice hockey team (VVS Moscow) of the Soviet Air Force – 11 players, as well as a team doctor and a masseur.
1953 – The play Waiting for Godot by Samuel Beckett receives its première in Paris.
1957 – In a speech given to the United States Congress, United States President Dwight D. Eisenhower announces the establishment of what will later be called the Eisenhower Doctrine.
1967 – Cultural Revolution: The Shanghai People's Commune is established following the seizure of power from local city officials by revolutionaries.
1968 – Alexander Dubček comes to power in Czechoslovakia, effectively beginning the "Prague Spring".
1969 – The Venera 5 space probe is launched at 06:28:08 UTC from Baikonur.
  1969   – Ariana Afghan Airlines Flight 701 crashes in Fernhill, West Sussex, while on approach to Gatwick Airport, killing 50 people.
1970 – The 7.1  Tonghai earthquake shakes Tonghai County, Yunnan province, China, with a maximum Mercalli intensity of X (Extreme). Between 10,000 and 15,000 people are known to have been killed and about another 26,000 are injured.
1972 – US President Richard Nixon announces the Space Shuttle program. 
1975 – The Tasman Bridge in Tasmania, Australia, is struck by the bulk ore carrier Lake Illawarra, killing twelve people.
1976 – The Khmer Rouge announce that the new Constitution of Democratic Kampuchea is ratified.
  1976   – The Troubles: Gunmen shoot dead ten Protestant civilians after stopping their minibus at Kingsmill in County Armagh, Northern Ireland, UK, allegedly as retaliation for a string of attacks on Catholic civilians in the area by Loyalists, particularly the killing of six Catholics the night before.
1991 – Georgian forces enter Tskhinvali, the capital of South Ossetia, Georgia, opening the 1991–92 South Ossetia War.
  1991   – Somali Civil War: The United States Embassy to Somalia in Mogadishu is evacuated by helicopter airlift days after the outbreak of violence in Mogadishu.
1993 – The oil tanker MV Braer runs aground on the coast of the Shetland Islands, spilling 84,700 tons of crude oil.
2005 – The dwarf planet Eris is discovered by Palomar Observatory-based astronomers, later motivating the International Astronomical Union (IAU) to define the term planet for the first time.
2014 – A launch of the communication satellite GSAT-14 aboard the GSLV MK.II D5 marks the first successful flight of an Indian cryogenic engine.

Births

Pre-1600
1209 – Richard, 1st Earl of Cornwall, English prince, nominal King of Germany (d. 1272)
1530 – Gaspar de Bono, monk of the Order of the Minims (d. 1571)
1548 – Francisco Suárez, Spanish priest, philosopher, and theologian (d. 1617)
1587 – Xu Xiake, Chinese geographer and explorer (d. 1641)
1592 – Shah Jahan, Mughal emperor (d. 1666)

1601–1900
1620 – Miklós Zrínyi, Croatian military commander (d. 1664)
1640 – Paolo Lorenzani, Italian composer (d. 1713)
1735 – Claude Martin, French-English general and explorer (d. 1800)
1767 – Jean-Baptiste Say, French economist and academic (d. 1832)
1779 – Stephen Decatur, American commander (d. 1820)
  1779   – Zebulon Pike, American general and explorer (d. 1813)
1781 – Gaspar Flores de Abrego, three terms mayor of San Antonio, in Spanish Texas (d. 1836)
1793 – Harvey Putnam, American lawyer and politician (d. 1855)
1808 – Anton Füster, Austrian priest and activist (d. 1881)
1834 – William John Wills, English surgeon and explorer (d. 1861)
1838 – Camille Jordan, French mathematician and academic (d. 1922)
1846 – Rudolf Christoph Eucken, German philosopher and author, Nobel Prize laureate (d. 1926)
  1846   – Mariam Baouardy, Syrian Roman Catholic nun; later canonized (d. 1878)
1855 – King Camp Gillette, American businessman, founded the Gillette Company (d. 1932)
1864 – Bob Caruthers, American baseball player and manager (d. 1911)
1867 – Dimitrios Gounaris, Greek lawyer and politician, 94th Prime Minister of Greece (d. 1922)
1871 – Frederick Converse, American composer and academic (d. 1940)
1874 – Joseph Erlanger, American physiologist and academic, Nobel Prize laureate (d. 1965)
1876 – Konrad Adenauer, German lawyer and politician, Chancellor of West Germany (d. 1967)
1879 – Hans Eppinger, Austrian physician and academic (d. 1946)
1880 – Nikolai Medtner, Russian pianist and composer (d. 1951)
1881 – Pablo Gargallo, Spanish sculptor and painter (d. 1934)
1882 – Herbert Bayard Swope, American journalist (d. 1958)
  1882   – Edwin Barclay, 18th president of Liberia (d. 1955)
1885 – Humbert Wolfe, Italian-English poet and civil servant (d. 1940)
1886 – Markus Reiner, Israeli physicist and engineer (d. 1976)
1892 – Agnes von Kurowsky, American nurse (d. 1984)
1893 – Paramahansa Yogananda, Indian-American guru and philosopher (d. 1952)
1897 – Kiyoshi Miki, Japanese philosopher and author (d. 1945)
1900 – Yves Tanguy, French-American painter (d. 1955)

1901–present
1902 – Hubert Beuve-Méry, French journalist (d. 1989)
  1902   – Stella Gibbons, English journalist and author (d. 1989)
1903 – Harold Gatty, Australian pilot and navigator (d. 1957)
1904 – Jeane Dixon, American astrologer and psychic (d. 1997)
  1904   – Erika Morini, Austrian violinist (d. 1995)
  1904   – George Plant, Executed Irish Republican (d. 1942)
1906 – Kathleen Kenyon, English archaeologist and academic (d. 1978)
1907 – Volmari Iso-Hollo, Finnish athlete (d. 1969)
1908 – George Dolenz, Italian-American actor (d. 1963)
1909 – Lucienne Bloch, Swiss-American sculptor, painter, and photographer (d. 1995)
  1909   – Stephen Cole Kleene, American mathematician and computer scientist (d. 1994)
1910 – Jack Lovelock, New Zealand runner and journalist (d. 1949)
1911 – Jean-Pierre Aumont, French actor and screenwriter (d. 2001)
  1914   – Doug Deitz, Australian rugby league player (d. 1994)
  1914   – George Reeves, American actor and director (d. 1959)
1915 – Arthur H. Robinson, Canadian geographer and cartographer (d. 2004)
1917 – Francis L. Kellogg, American businessman and diplomat (d. 2006)
  1917   – Wieland Wagner, German director and producer (d. 1966)
  1917   – Jane Wyman, American actress (d. 2007)
1919 – Hector Abhayavardhana, Sri Lankan theorist and politician (d. 2012)
  1919   – Severino Gazzelloni, Italian flute player (d. 1992)
1920 – Arturo Benedetti Michelangeli, Italian pianist and educator (d. 1995)
1921 – Friedrich Dürrenmatt, Swiss author and playwright (d. 1990)
  1921   – Jean, Grand Duke of Luxembourg, Luxembourgish soldier and aristocrat (d. 2019)
  1921   – John H. Reed, American politician and diplomat, 67th Governor of Maine (d. 2012)
1922 – Anthony Synnot, Australian admiral (d. 2001)
1923 – Sam Phillips, American radio host and producer, founded Sun Records (d. 2003)
1926 – Veikko Karvonen, Finnish runner (d. 2007)
  1926   – W. D. Snodgrass, American poet (d. 2009)
  1926   – Hosea Williams, American businessman and activist (d. 2000)
1927 – Sivaya Subramuniyaswami, American guru and author, founded Iraivan Temple (d. 2001)
1928 – Imtiaz Ahmed, Pakistani cricketer (d. 2016)
  1928   – Zulfikar Ali Bhutto, Pakistani lawyer and politician, 4th President of Pakistan (d. 1979)
  1928   – Walter Mondale, American soldier, lawyer, and politician, 42nd Vice President of the United States (d. 2021)
1929 – Aulis Rytkönen, Finnish footballer and manager (d. 2014)
1930 – Kevin Considine, Australian rugby league player
1931 – Alvin Ailey, American dancer and choreographer, founded the Alvin Ailey American Dance Theater (d. 1989)
  1931   – Alfred Brendel, Austrian pianist, poet, and author
  1931   – Robert Duvall, American actor and director
1932 – Umberto Eco, Italian novelist, literary critic, and philosopher (d. 2016)
  1932   – Chuck Noll, American football player and coach (d. 2014)
1934 – Phil Ramone, South African-American songwriter and producer, co-founded A & R Recording (d. 2013) 
  1934   – Murli Manohar Joshi, Indian politician
1936 – Florence King, American journalist and memoirist (d. 2016)
  1936   – Terry Lineen, New Zealand rugby player (d. 2020)
1938 – Juan Carlos I of Spain
  1938   – Ngũgĩ wa Thiong'o, Kenyan author and playwright
1939 – M. E. H. Maharoof, Sri Lankan politician (d. 1997)
1940 – Athol Guy, Australian singer-songwriter and bassist
1941 – Bob Cunis, New Zealand cricketer (d. 2008)
  1941   – Chuck McKinley, American tennis player (d. 1986)
  1941   – Hayao Miyazaki, Japanese animator, director, and screenwriter
  1941   – Mansoor Ali Khan Pataudi, Indian cricketer and coach (d. 2011)
1942 – Maurizio Pollini, Italian pianist and conductor
  1942   – Charlie Rose, American journalist and talk show host
1943 – Mary Gaudron, Australian lawyer and judge
  1943   – Murtaz Khurtsilava, Georgian footballer and manager
1944 – Carolyn McCarthy, American nurse and politician
  1944   – Ed Rendell, American politician, 45th Governor of Pennsylvania
1946 – Diane Keaton, American actress, director, and businesswoman 
1947 – Mike DeWine, American lawyer and politician, 70th Governor of Ohio
1948 – Ted Lange, American actor, director, and screenwriter
1950 – Ioan P. Culianu, Romanian historian, philosopher, and author (d. 1991)
  1950   – Peter Goldsmith, Baron Goldsmith, English lawyer and politician, Attorney General for England and Wales
  1950   – John Manley, Canadian lawyer and politician, 8th Deputy Prime Minister of Canada
  1950   – Chris Stein, American guitarist, songwriter, and producer
1952 – Uli Hoeneß, German footballer and manager
1953 – Pamela Sue Martin, American actress
  1953   – Mike Rann, English-Australian journalist and politician, 44th Premier of South Australia
  1953   – George Tenet, American civil servant and academic, 18th Director of Central Intelligence
1954 – Alex English, American basketball player and coach
  1954   – László Krasznahorkai, Hungarian author and screenwriter
1955 – Mamata Banerjee, Indian lawyer and politician, Chief Minister of West Bengal
1956 – Frank-Walter Steinmeier, German academic and politician, 14th Vice-Chancellor of Germany
1957 – Kevin Hastings, Australian rugby league player
  1957   – George Moroko, Australian rugby league player
1958 – Ron Kittle, American baseball player and manager
1959 – Clancy Brown, American actor
  1959   – Nancy Delahunt, Canadian curler
1960 – Glenn Strömberg, Swedish footballer and sportscaster
1961 – Iris DeMent, American singer-songwriter and guitarist
1962 – Suzy Amis, American actress and model
  1962   – Danny Jackson, American baseball player and manager
1963 – Jeff Fassero, American baseball player and coach
1965 – Vinnie Jones, English/Welsh footballer and actor
  1965   – Stuart Raper, Australian rugby league player and coach
  1965   – Patrik Sjöberg, Swedish high jumper
1968 – Carrie Ann Inaba, American actress, dancer, and choreographer
  1968   – Joé Juneau, Canadian ice hockey player and engineer
1969 – Marilyn Manson, American singer-songwriter, actor, and director
  1969   – Shaun Micheel, American golfer
1970 – Nigel Gaffey, Australian rugby league player
1971 – Stian Carstensen, Norwegian multi-instrumentalist and composer 
1972 – Sakis Rouvas, Greek singer-songwriter, producer, and actor
1973 – Uday Chopra, Bollywood actor and filmmaker
1974 – Iwan Thomas, Welsh sprinter and coach
1975 – Bradley Cooper, American actor and producer
  1975   – Warrick Dunn, American football player
  1975   – Mike Grier, American ice hockey player and scout
1976 – Diego Tristán, Spanish footballer
1977 – Gavin Lester, Australian rugby league player
1978 – January Jones, American actress
1979 – Kyle Calder, Canadian ice hockey player
  1979   – Giuseppe Gibilisco, Italian pole vaulter
1980 – Luke Bailey, Australian rugby league player
  1980   – Brad Meyers, Australian rugby league player
1981 – Deadmau5 (Joel Thomas Zimmerman), Canadian musician
1982 – Janica Kostelić, Croatian skier
1984 – Derrick Atkins, Bahamian sprinter
  1984   – Matt Ballin, Australian rugby league player
  1984   – Bronx Goodwin, Australian rugby league player
1985 – Filinga Filiga, New Zealand rugby league player
  1985   – Diego Vera, Uruguayan footballer
1986 – Deepika Padukone, Indian actress
1987 – Dexter Bean, American race car driver
  1987   – Kristin Cavallari, American TV personality
  1987   – Stuart Flanagan, Australian rugby league player
1988 – Azizulhasni Awang, Malaysian track cyclist
  1988   – Luke Daniels, English footballer
  1988   – Mandip Gill, English actress
1989 – Krisztián Németh, Hungarian footballer
1990 – Mark Nicholls, Australian rugby league player
1991 – Denis Alibec, Romanian footballer
1993 – Stefan Rzadzinski, Canadian race car driver
1994 – Lachlan Fitzgibbon, Australian rugby league player
  1994   – Tyrone Phillips, Australian rugby league player
1995 – Toafofoa Sipley, New Zealand rugby league player
1996 – James Fisher-Harris, New Zealand rugby league player

Deaths

Pre-1600
 842 – Al-Mu'tasim, Abbasid caliph (b. 796)
 941 – Zhang Yanhan, Chinese chancellor (b. 884)
1066 – Edward the Confessor, English king (b. 1004)
1173 – Bolesław IV the Curly, High Duke of Poland (b. 1120)
1382 – Philippa Plantagenet, Countess of Ulster (b. 1355)
1400 – John Montacute, 3rd Earl of Salisbury, English politician (b. 1350)
1430 – Philippa of England, Queen of Denmark, Norway and Sweden (b. 1394)
1477 – Charles, Duke of Burgundy (b. 1433)
1524 – Marko Marulić, Croatian poet (b. 1450)
1527 – Felix Manz, Swiss martyr (b. 1498)
1578 – Giulio Clovio, Dalmatian painter (b. 1498)
1580 – Anna Sibylle of Hanau-Lichtenberg, German noblewoman (b. 1542)
1589 – Catherine de' Medici, queen of Henry II of France (b. 1519)

1601–1900
1713 – Jean Chardin, French explorer and author (b. 1643)
1740 – Antonio Lotti, Italian composer and educator (b. 1667)
1762 – Empress Elizabeth of Russia (b. 1709)
1771 – John Russell, 4th Duke of Bedford, English politician, Secretary of State for the Southern Department (b. 1710)
1796 – Samuel Huntington, American jurist and politician, 18th Governor of Connecticut (b. 1731)
1823 – George Johnston, Scottish-Australian colonel and politician, Lieutenant Governor of New South Wales (b. 1764)
1845 – Robert Smirke, English painter and illustrator (b. 1753)
1846 – Alfred Thomas Agate, American painter and illustrator (b. 1812)
1858 – Joseph Radetzky von Radetz, Austrian field marshal (b. 1766)
1860 – John Neumann, Czech-American bishop and saint (b. 1811)
1883 – Charles Tompson, Australian poet and public servant (b. 1806)
1885 – Peter Christen Asbjørnsen, Norwegian author and scholar (b. 1812)
1888 – Henri Herz, Austrian pianist and composer (b. 1803)
1899 – Ezra Otis Kendall, American professor, astronomer and mathematician (b. 1818)

1901–present
1904 – Karl Alfred von Zittel, German paleontologist and geologist (b. 1839)
1910 – Léon Walras, French-Swiss economist and academic (b. 1834)
1917 – Isobel Lilian Gloag, English painter (b. 1865)
1922 – Ernest Shackleton, Anglo-Irish sailor and explorer (b. 1874)
1933 – Calvin Coolidge, American lawyer and politician, 30th President of the United States (b. 1872)
1942 – Tina Modotti, Italian photographer, model, actress, and activist (b. 1896)
1943 – George Washington Carver, American botanist, educator, and inventor (b. 1864)
1951 – Soh Jaipil, South Korean-American journalist and activist (b. 1864)
  1951   – Andrei Platonov, Russian journalist and author (b. 1899)
1952 – Victor Hope, 2nd Marquess of Linlithgow, Scottish colonel and politician, 46th Governor-General of India (b. 1887)
  1952   – Hristo Tatarchev, Bulgarian-Italian physician and activist (b. 1869)
1954 – Rabbit Maranville, American baseball player and manager (b. 1891)
1956 – Mistinguett, French actress and singer (b. 1875)
1963 – Rogers Hornsby, American baseball player, coach, and manager (b. 1896)
1970 – Max Born, German physicist and mathematician, Nobel Prize laureate (b. 1882)
  1970   – Roberto Gerhard, Catalan composer and scholar (b. 1896)
1971 – Douglas Shearer, Canadian-American sound designer and engineer (b. 1899)
1974 – Lev Oborin, Russian pianist and educator (b. 1907)
1976 – John A. Costello, Irish lawyer and politician, 3rd Taoiseach of Ireland (b. 1891)
1978 – Wyatt Emory Cooper, American author and screenwriter (b. 1927)
1979 – Billy Bletcher, American actor, singer, and screenwriter (b. 1894)
  1979   – Charles Mingus, American bassist, composer, bandleader (b. 1922)
1981 – Harold Urey, American chemist and astronomer, Nobel Prize laureate (b. 1893)
  1981   – Lanza del Vasto, Italian poet and philosopher (b. 1901)
1982 – Hans Conried, American actor (b. 1917)
  1982   – Edmund Herring, Australian general and politician, 7th Chief Justice of Victoria (b. 1892)
1985 – Robert L. Surtees, American cinematographer (b. 1906)
1987 – Margaret Laurence, Canadian author and academic (b. 1926)
  1987   – Herman Smith-Johannsen, Norwegian-Canadian skier (b. 1875)
1990 – Arthur Kennedy, American actor (b. 1914)
1991 – Vasko Popa, Serbian poet and academic (b. 1922)
1994 – Tip O'Neill, American lawyer and politician, 55th Speaker of the United States House of Representatives (b. 1912)
1997 – André Franquin, Belgian author and illustrator (b. 1924)
  1997   – Burton Lane, American composer and songwriter (b. 1912)
1998 – Sonny Bono, American singer-songwriter, producer, actor, and politician (b. 1935)
2000 – Kumar Ponnambalam, Sri Lankan Tamil lawyer and politician (b. 1938)
2003 – Roy Jenkins, Welsh politician, Chancellor of the Exchequer (b. 1920)
2004 – Norman Heatley, English biologist and chemist, co-developed penicillin (b. 1911)
2006 – Merlyn Rees, Welsh educator and politician, Home Secretary (b. 1920)
2007 – Momofuku Ando, Taiwanese-Japanese businessman, founded Nissin Foods (b. 1910)
2009 – Griffin Bell, American lawyer and politician, 72nd United States Attorney General (b. 1918)
2010 – Willie Mitchell, American singer-songwriter, trumpet player, and producer (b. 1928)
  2010   – Kenneth Noland, American painter (b. 1924)
2012 – Isaac Díaz Pardo, Spanish painter and sculptor (b. 1920)
  2012   – Frederica Sagor Maas, American author, playwright, and screenwriter (b. 1900) 
2013 – Qazi Hussain Ahmad, Pakistani scholar and politician (b. 1938)
2014 – Eusébio, Mozambican-Portuguese footballer and manager (b. 1942)
  2014   – Carmen Zapata, American actress (b. 1927)
2015 – Jean-Pierre Beltoise, French racing driver and motorcycle racer (b. 1937)
  2015   – Bernard Joseph McLaughlin, American bishop (b. 1912)
2016 – Pierre Boulez, French pianist, composer, and conductor (b. 1925)
2017 – Jill Saward, English rape victim and activist (b. 1965)
2018 – Asghar Khan, Pakistani three star general and politician (b. 1921)
  2018   – Thomas Bopp, American astronomer best known as the co-discoverer of comet Hale–Bopp (b. 1949)
  2018   – Karin von Aroldingen, German ballerina (b. 1941)
2019 – Bernice Sandler, American women's rights activist (b. 1928)
  2019   – Dragoslav Šekularac, Serbian footballer and manager (b. 1937)
2020 – Tafazzul Haque Habiganji, Bangladeshi Islamic scholar and politician (b. 1938)
2021 – Colin Bell, English footballer (b. 1946)
  2021   – John Georgiadis, English violinist and composer (b. 1939)
2022 – Kim Mi-soo, South Korean actress and model (b. 1992)

Holidays and observances
Christian Feast day:
Charles of Mount Argus
John Neumann (Catholic Church)
Pope Telesphorus
Simeon Stylites (Latin Church)
January 5 (Eastern Orthodox liturgics)
Harbin International Ice and Snow Sculpture Festival (Harbin, China)
Joma Shinji (Japan)
National Bird Day (United States)
 The Twelfth day of Christmas and the Twelfth Night of Christmas. (Western Christianity)

References

External links

 BBC: On This Day
 
 Historical Events on January 5

Days of the year
January
Discordian holidays